Bechstedt is a municipality in the district Saalfeld-Rudolstadt, in Thuringia, Germany.

References

Municipalities in Thuringia
Saalfeld-Rudolstadt
Schwarzburg-Rudolstadt